Lanza (or Lancia) are a family of the Sicilian nobility descended from the Dukes of Bavaria.

History
The origin of the surname Lanza is much debated: according to many historians, the surname comes from the Bavarian dukes.
The thesis is supported by Robert Guiscard's document of 16 December 1080 in which he writes:

(La)
Ideo ad humilem supplicationem nobilis consanguinei nostri, fidelis dilecti Conradi Lanza, militis, ad praesens unius ex capinaeis nostrae militiae et descendentis ex ducibus Bavariae, nobis perrectam et suis maiorumque suorum consideratis servitiis et benemeritis 

(En)
So humble supplication made by our blood relative, the faithful and belove soldier Corrado Lanza, currently ore of captains of our warfare and a descendant form the Dukes of Bavaria, and considered the services and the merits of his and of his ancestors 

According to the Biographical dictionary of Italians  it derives from the first exponent known with this name, Manfred I Lancia: it owes its name to the fact that he was the captain of the great spear (lancifero or capitano della grande lanciain Italian) of Emperor Frederick Barbarossa, but his service to the emperor is not confirmed by sources.
According to some genealogists Manfred was the son of Guglielmo del Vasto, first Marques of Busca.

Other historians argue that Lanzas are Dukes of Bavaria and Ernesto Wittelsbach originated the noble family Lanza or Lancia, in 970 he was nicknamed captain of the great spear (capitano della grande lancia translated in Italian), from which the name. And from Ernesto Lanza derived Corrado Lanza, his son, and then after Gennaro Lanza.

Sicily

The original branch is that of the Barons of Longi by Galvano Lanza, Lord of Brolo (1200).
In the 17th century, the Lanza family was divided into the main branches of the Dukes of Brolo and the princes of Trabia. From the first came the Marchesi Lanza (from 1814), of the Dukes of Brolo, Baroni di Piraino, Baroni di Longi, Baroni of Marcatobianco, of Butti and Mangaliviti, Barons of Malaspina and Baroni of the Supplements of Trapani, Sciacca and Mazara; from the Princes of Trabia, however, came the princes and dukes Lanza and the princes of Mirto [9].

In Sicily, everything would start with Bonifacio count d'Agliano son of Corrado I (of the Dukes of Bavaria) d'Agliano and brother of Manfredi. The nobleman had four children by Costanza Maletta: Bianca (who was actually called Beatrice Lancia) who married Emperor Frederick II of Swabia; Galvano who was executed with Corradino of Swabia in 1268; Jailbird.

Other sources want Bianca Lanza, daughter of Corrado Lanza of the Dukes of Bavaria and Lord of Brolo, Count of Fondi and sister of Galvano Lanza, Baron of Longi and Count of the Principality. Then summarizing another genealogy: Founder Ernesto of Bavaria in 990, then Conrad of the Dukes of Bavaria, Federico Lancia Count of Fondi, Don Corrado Lancia of the Dukes of Bavaria of Brolo, Count of Fondi 1168 and then his son Galeotto.

From Galeotto, I Baron of Longi and Lord of Brolo (1255, son of Galvano, Count of the Principality, Prince of Taranto and perhaps of Salerno, Lord of Longi), were born: Blasco, II Baron of Longi and I Baron of Ficarra and Brolo and Corrado III Baron of Longi and II Baron of Ficarra and Brolo, was Grand Chancellor of the Kingdom of Sicily in 1297, Lord of Castemainardo and founder of the barons of Longi, Ficarra and Brolo and of the barons then princes of Trabia and Federico, Viceroy of the Kingdom of Sicily in 1258, during the reign of Manfredi of Sicily, son of Bianca Lancia. In 1256 Manfredi Lancia was a royal castellan and straticoto of Messina to be identified perhaps with the same captain who was the executioner of Malta and Gozo.

The first to possess the fief of Trabia is BlascoLanza (Catania 1466 - Palermo 1535) of the Barons of Longi (his grandfather Blasco was the 7th Baron of Longi), famous jurist, judge of the Great Court of the Kingdom in 1507 (charge conferred by King Ferdinand II of Aragon "the Catholic" and later by the emperor Charles V), deputy of the Kingdom in 1508, vicar general in Sicily in 1514 and other positions still. Thanks to the marriage with Leonardo's daughter Bartolomeo, protonotary and president of the Kingdom of Sicily, he obtained the territory of Trabia. With the privilege of 14 November 1509 made executive from 11 June 1510, this territory becomes a noble feud. Blasco's son, Cesare Lanza is the first baron of Trabia, as well as Castanea, a fief inherited from his mother: in 1564 he was also the first count of Mussomeli.

Trabia soon moved to Principality and Ottavio Lanza was the first prince of it in 1601. Giuseppe Lanza, Duke of Camastra, is known to have been the proponent of the reconstruction of Catania and Val di Noto after the earthquake of 1693. The years and the members pass of the family, when Ignatius Prince of Trabia, became courtly councilor of the emperor Charles VI of Habsburg, combining the position of captain of Palermo in 1717 and praetor in 1737.
Giuseppe Lanza di Trabia (1750-1855), Sicilian archaeologist and collector, gentleman of the chamber and knight of the Order of San Gennaro, minister of ecclesiastical affairs, made an excellent and profitable marriage joining with Stefania Branciforte of the princes of Leonforte and princess of Butera : in this way all the titles and assets of the two families were brought together.

In 1658, Pietro Maria Lanza, XV Baron of Longi (son of Baldassarre II Lanza XIV Baron of Longi and Donna Paola Romeo), was the last male of the Lanza to own the Barony of Longi, in fact he did not want to respect the so-called "Agnatizia Successione "in favor of the second-born branch of his brother Giuseppe Lanza, Baron of Malaspina, to favor his only daughter, Flavia Lanza, who by marrying Gaspare di Napoli, in fact brought the first and historic barony of the Lanza of Sicily into the family of Naples. First and last example of Sicilian Succession (towards other families) in the main branch of the Lanza of Sicily.

There were bitter struggles in the family (the brothers Pietro Maria and Giuseppe died), between the cousins Donna Flavia and don Filippo Lanza (and Filingeri), between 1658 and 1665. There was a truce described by Federico Lancia and Grassellini in his work : Dei Lancia di Brolo family tree and biographies, ed. Gaudieno, 1879.

From the Baron Filippo Lanza and Filingeri and Donna Maria Antonia Maniaci of the princes of San Michele and of San Giorgio and of the dukes of Santa Maria, Baron Michele Lanza, Baron of Malaspina, of the Dukes of Brolo, of the Barons of Longi and Baron of Supplements was born of Trapani, Sciacca and Mazara (from 1722), who married the heir of the Spinotto family, Maria Rosalia. Corrado Lanza was born, Baron of Malaspina, of the Dukes of Brolo, of the Barons of Longi, Baron of Supplements of Trapani, Sciacca and Mazara from 1751, Senator, Mayor and Attorney General of Palermo, Rational Master of the Patricians of Palermo, Member of the Brotherhood of Bianchi and Governor of Pio Monte di Pietà and Opera Pia of Navarro. From Corrado Lanza and Spinotto who married the noble Eleonora Morello and Colnago of Santa Venera, were born: Michele and Ferdinando Lanza and Morello: the first gave birth to the Sicilian Firstborn branch and inherited the paternal titles: of the Dukes of Brolo, of the Barons of Longi, Baron of Supplements of Trapani, Sciacca and Mazara (1791) and Baron of Malaspina and by Sicilian succession by his grandmother: Barone di Marcatobianco and Barone di Butti and Mangaliviti. He was named Marquis of Marcatobianco in 1814 (Protonotary of the Kingdom, Italian historical and noble encyclopedia of the MarquisVittorio Spreti, Ed. Italian Historical-noble Encyclopedia, 1968, vol. 4). The Second-born, Ferdinando Lanza of the Dukes of Brolo, of the Barons of Longi, of the Barons of the Supplements of Trapani, Sciacca and Mazara, of the Barons of Malaspina, was Colonel of the Real Army of the Two Sicilies, Commander of the Val Demone, Knight of Law of the Real Military Order of San Giorgio della Reunion (1819), Gold Medal of Military Valor in 1799, married in Palermo with the Countess of the Holy Roman Empire, Donna Maria Santa Testa, moved to Naples and founded the Lanza Neapolitan Branch of Sicily.

Colonel Ferdinando Lanza (and Morello), had many children and among them: the Cav. Firstborn Corrado (without male descendants), Cav. Don Gaetano Lanza, second son, with male offspring and Don Raffaele, accepted in the Royal Guard Corps of Horse 1843, as reported by the historian Bonazzi. From Don Gaetano Lanza develops the legitimate branch of the Lanza di Brolo, of the barons of Longi up to our days, in chronological sequence: the cav. Don Ferdinando, don Corrado, don Michele, don Eduardo (with his son don Salvatore and with Assunta), Corrado (with his sons don Michele and don Francesco), and don Ferdinando. [Without source] Corrado Lanza (and Spinotto), son of Michele Barone of Malaspina and Baron of Supplements 1722 (of Filippo, of Giuseppe, of Baldassarre II XIV Baron of Longi), of the Dukes of Brolo, of the Barons of Longi, Baron of the Supplements of Trapani, Sciacca and Mazara (1751) and Barone di Malaspina (1733), was a great man of the Sicilian institutions, was Senator of Palermo in the years 1751-52 and 1760–61, was Mayor of the Senate of Palermo (Grande di Spagna of First Class), several times between 1770 and 1790, Attorney General, was Rational Master of the Noble Patrizii of Palermo, Governor of the Pio Monte di Pietà, Governor of the Opera Pia di Navarro, Councilor of the Compagnia dei Bianchi of Palermo (exclusive to Nobili only), he was the forefather of the Lanza of Barons of Longi and the Dukes of Brolo and the Barons then Marc hesi of Marcatobianco for Sicilian Succession from his mother, Maria Rosalia Spinotto (sister of the Consul of Genoa in Palermo, Barone di Marcatobianco, of Butti and Mangaliviti), He died in Naples in September 1791 and was buried in the historic Church of S. Anna of the Royal Palace a few steps from her Neapolitan home.

Among the other historical representatives of the Lanza, Francesco Girolamo Lanza di Scalea who fought in the ranks of the Thousand of Giuseppe Garibaldi: Francesco later became a senator of the Kingdom of Italy. Curiosity is that on the same front, but opposite to the Thousand, was present the Lieutenant General of the Bourbon army, Ferdinando Lanza (only namesake of the Lanza, not belonging to the branch of the Lanza of Sicily, in fact it came from Nocera dei Pagani, province of Salerno, also reported by historian Federico Lanza and Grassellini, historian of the Lanza family, in the great work: "Dei Lancia di Brolo, genealogical tree and biographies", publisher GB Gaudieno, 1879).

Legends on the origin of the Lanza surname
These are the three suggested origins of the Lanza surname.

The most suggestive one speaks of a Corrado, grandson of Ernesto di Wittelsbach, Duke of Bavaria and Pomerania, who goes to the Holy Land and there, with the help of the priest Orion, finds the tip of the Lancia with which Longino struck our side's, Lord Jesus Christ.

The most likely, it is "from serious German authors": it speaks of an Ernesto younger brother of the Duke of Bavaria who resolves a conflict, born between his brother and the Duke of Saxony, winning in a tournament with the Lancia;

The most fascinating, referring to Flaminio Rossi, to Guglielmo Paradino and to Filippo Cirni, tells that an Ernesto of the Dukes of Bavaria and Duke of Pomerania, in a tournament wins a hundred German knights beating them all with the Lancia.

See also
 Anna of Hohenstaufen
 Bianca Lancia
 Frederick II, Holy Roman Emperor 
 Italian nobility
 Manfred, King of Sicily

References

 Marquis Corrado Lanza Marcatobianco,  A laurel to the true, enthusiasm , ed. Borel and Bompard, Naples, 1837;
 Federico Lancia and Grassellini,  Dei Lancia or Lanza di Brolo family tree and biographies , ed. Gaudieno, 1879;
 Mango by Casalgerardo A.,  The nobility of Sicily , Palermo, 1915, vols. 2, passim;
 Giuseppe Sorge,  Mussomeli from the origin to the abolition of feudality , vol. II, Catania 1916, then Edizioni Ristampe Siciliane, Palermo 1982.
 San Martino de Spucches F.,  The history of the feuds and noble titles of Sicily , Palermo, 1924, vols. 10, passim;
 Ganci M.,  The great titles of the Kingdom of Sicily,  Palermo - Siracusa, 1988, 209;
 
 
 Palizzolo Gravina V.,  Historical-heraldic dictionary of Sicily , II ed., Palermo, 1991, 227;
 
 Central State Archive. Directorate General for Archives. Servicio Araldico. Register of Royal Decree Transcriptions. Royal Decrees (personal appointments) 1.Letter of concession / titles of nobility of: Luigi Lanza and Branciforte, 9th prince of Trabia, etc .; 3 October 1855./ 1.1.-Letter of concession / noble titles of: Luigi Lanza Branciforte: 10th prince of Villafranca, 10th duke of the Sala di Paruta; 8 April 1876. 2. Grant letter / noble titles of: Cipriano Lanza and Branciforte, 10th prince of Trabia, etc .; May 6, 1896.
 State Archives Rome - Consulta Araldica- vol. XII fasc. 4578.